George Fox (born March 23, 1960) is a Canadian country/western music singer/songwriter raised in Cochrane, Alberta, the son of cattle ranchers Bert and Gert Fox.

Career

His first single, "Angelina", reached No. 8 on the Canadian country music charts. In subsequent years, "Goldmine", "No Trespassing", "Mustang Heart", "I Give You My Word", "What's Holding Me" and "Breakfast Alone" also became top 10 singles and signature songs. He has written a book of short stories depicting ranch life entitled My First Cow.

Honours

Awards include the Canadian Country Music Awards (CCMA) Male Vocalist Of The Year (three times) and the Juno Awards Country Male Vocalist Of The Year (three times). Fox was host of the CCMA Awards television show from 1991 to 1994.

In 1995, his home town of Cochrane named a new street George Fox Trail in his honour.

In September 2022 he will be inducted into the Canadian Country Music Hall of Fame.

Personal life

Fox and his wife Monica live near Ancaster in southern Ontario with their two daughters.

Discography

Studio albums

Compilation albums

Singles

Music videos

Notes

References

External links
 George Fox official website
 [ "George Fox"], Allmusic
 "George Fox", Canadian Encyclopedia of Music

1960 births
Canadian country singer-songwriters
Canadian male singer-songwriters
Juno Award winners
Living people
Musicians from Calgary
People from Cochrane, Alberta
Canadian Country Music Association Male Artist of the Year winners
Canadian Country Music Association Rising Star Award winners